Tendai Mtawarira (born 1 August 1985) is a Zimbabwean-South African retired professional rugby union player who last played for Old Glory DC in Major League Rugby and previously for the South Africa national team and the  in Super Rugby. He was born in Zimbabwe and qualified for South Africa on residency grounds, before later acquiring South African citizenship. Mtawarira, a prop, is known by the nickname The Beast.

Mtawarira made his debut for South Africa against Wales on 14 June 2008. With 117 caps, he is the most capped prop in South African history and the third most capped Springbok of all time behind Victor Matfield and Bryan Habana.

With his 117 caps, Mtawarira is the 17th most capped international forward of all time and the 5th most capped prop of all time.
He is also a 2019 Rugby World Cup Winner.

He owns a security company in South Africa and a CBO known as The Beast Foundation

Early life

Mtawarira was born on 1 August 1985 in Harare, Zimbabwe. He attended Churchill School in Harare for five years before being given a full scholarship to Peterhouse Boys' School, an independent school in Mashonaland East. At the age of 15, while at Churchill, he was spotted by Zimbabwean coach Joey Muwadzuri who invited him to join the Under 19 side at the National Schools Festival. Later that year Muwadzuri invited him to be part of Cats and Dogs Rugby Academy Team that won the National Seniors 7's tournament. He played with Dan Hondo, Pete Benade, Tonderai "Kawaza" Chavhanga, among others.

Playing career
After a strong 2008 Super 14 season with the Sharks it was apparent that he had great potential and his speed would be beneficial with the new rules (ELV's).

He was then selected in the Springbok squad and made his debut against Wales on 14 June 2008. At first received limited game time. Later he had the opportunity to be a reserve during the test against the Wallabies in Perth. Once he came on, his impact was significant; he went on to be a part of the starting lineup for all the subsequent Tri-nations tests.

A highlight of Mtawarira's career to date came in the first test of the British & Irish Lions tour in 2009. Scrumming against Phil Vickery, Mtawarira dominated his more experienced opponent, leading to Vickery being substituted after 45 minutes, and a man-of-the-match award for Mtawarira. However, he conceded several penalties in the second test when playing opposite Welsh prop Adam Jones. Similarly, in the third test, Mtawarira was largely ineffectual in the scrum, with the returning Vickery and replacement John Hayes subduing him up front.

On 16 June 2018, Mtawarira played his 100th test match against England. He was dropped to the bench for South Africa's loss to Australia on 8 September 2018, and sustained a neck injury against New Zealand on 6 October 2018, meaning he missed the Springboks' 2018 tour to Europe.

Mtawarira was named in South Africa's squad for the 2019 Rugby World Cup. South Africa went on to win the tournament, defeating England in the final. Mtawarira's scrummaging in the final was described as destructive, and South Africa won many scrum penalties.

As well as his 117 Test matches, Mtawarira has played uncapped games for the Springboks against the Barbarians in 2010 and 2016, and against World XVs in 2014 and 2015. He has also played twice for the Barbarians.

Mtawarira also holds the record for the most Super Rugby caps by a South African with 160 caps.

Test Match record

Pld = Games Played, W = Games Won, D = Games Drawn, L = Games Lost, Tri = Tries Scored, Pts = Points Scored

Test tries

Citizenship controversy
Although Mtawarira was fully eligible to play for South Africa under IRB rules, his Zimbabwean nationality was a sticking point in 2009 and 2010. South Africa has a policy of only allowing its nationals to represent the country, although it has been somewhat flexible; the South African Rugby Union (SARU) officially cleared him to play with the Boks in the November 2009 Tests, after receiving clearance from the country's sports minister Makhenkesi Stofile.

More recently, his citizenship was a minor political issue in the country. In January 2010, Butana Komphela, an ANC member of the National Assembly and chair of its sports committee, publicly threatened to charge the SARU with "illegally" fielding Mtawarira and have him deported to Zimbabwe. Shortly after the threat, Mtawarira told the Sunday Independent,

Later in the year, the South African government reaffirmed its policy that only South African nationals would be allowed to represent the country in international competition, which made Mtawarira unavailable for selection to the Springboks in the June Tests; by that time, his application for South African citizenship had been tied up in red tape. On 25 June 2010, the SARU announced that Minister of Home Affairs Nkosazana Dlamini-Zuma had granted Mtawarira's request for South African citizenship. The immediate effect was to make him eligible for selection in the 2010 Tri Nations.

Notes

References

External links

Mtawarira at Grundlingh Enslin's Springbok Rugby Hall of Fame

1985 births
Living people
Alumni of Churchill School (Harare)
Alumni of Peterhouse Boys' School
Expatriate rugby union players in the United States
Naturalised citizens of South Africa
Old Glory DC players
Rugby union props
Sharks (rugby union) players
Sharks (Currie Cup) players
South Africa international rugby union players
South African expatriate rugby union players
South African expatriate sportspeople in the United States
Sportspeople from Harare
Zimbabwean emigrants to South Africa
Zimbabwean rugby union players